Size of Wales is a climate change charity with the aim of conserving an area of tropical rainforest twice the size of Wales. The project currently supports 7 forest protection projects and 1 tree planting project across Africa and South America. The charity focuses upon furthering the promotion of rainforest conservation as a national response to the global issue of climate change.

Size of Wales aims to raise awareness about climate change and the importance of protecting the natural world through their Education Programme, visiting schools across Wales and delivering interactive and educational workshops and special events. Additionally, Size of Wales hosts a number of campaigns to raise awareness about the cause and effects of climate change and equally raise funds for their forest projects. Flagship campaign, Go Green Day encourages businesses, schools and other groups or individuals to take green action - from wearing a green wig to pledging changes in behavior for the sake of our environment.

The size of Wales 
Wales is 20,779 km2 (8,023 sq mi) in size, the equivalent of 14 million rugby size pitches. 'An area the size of Wales' is frequently used to measure the rate of forest destruction. The Size of Wales aims to turn that negative use of the country's size on its head, by encouraging the people of Wales to take positive action and help protect an area of tropical forest equivalent to the size of their nation.
BBC Radio 4's numbers programme uses the size of Wales as a scale of measurement. In this scale a milliwales (1/1000 of a Wales) is Barry, whilst a deciwales (1/10 of a Wales) is Snowdonia National Park and a hectowales (100 Waleses) is Saudi Arabia.

Forest Projects 

 10 Million Trees: This tree planting project based in Uganda aims to plant 10 million trees in the heavily deforested region of Mbale. Saplings are planted in nurseries and then distributed to families and farmers across the region. They provide local communities with food, shelter and a source of income. The trees also help to bind the soil on Mount Elgon's hillsides, lessening the risk of deadly landslides.
 Communities Supporting Gorillas and Forests, in partnership with Fauna & Flora International: This project in Democratic Republic of Congo is supporting the creation of two community-led reserves in part of the world's second largest rainforest. The forests are home to many rare and endangered species and it is therefore essential to protect them. The reserves also provide training and jobs for local communities.
 Wapichan Land Rights, in partnership with Forest Peoples Programme: This project aims to aid the Wapichan people of Guyana to legally secure and protect their vast ancestral territory and maintain their traditional forest. Working with the indigenous community to facilitate and enable them to maintain traditional forest knowledge in order to sustain their traditional way of life whilst maintaining healthy forest ecosystems, contributing to climate change mitigation and promoting sustainable livelihoods.
 Protecting the Coastal Forests of Kenya, in partnership with WWF: These forests are a biodiversity hot spot but are under threat from illegal logging, fires, poorly planned development and unsustainable charcoal production. Recognised as a conservation priority. The forests of Eastern Africa provide a vital base for the livelihoods and economic and socio-cultural activities serving a population of more than 3 million and also have important cultural, spiritual and historical value to the community. The coastal forests also play an important role in storing carbon and enhancing local resilience to the impact of climate change.
 Securing Ogiek ancestral lands, indigenous forests and livelihoods, in partnership with Forest People Programme: This project aims to help the indigenous Ogiek people of Mount Elgon in Kenya gain legal rights for their lands. In 2000 the Ogiek were evicted from their lands in the name of 'conservation'. These evictions allow the Kenya Forest Service (KFS) to take control of these lands and forests. In reality, KFS receive payments from farmers to enter, cut down, and severely degrade indigenous forest. The Ogiek have demonstrated that when the indigenous community controls the land, deforestation decreases as does charcoal burning and elephant poaching.
 Securing the Wampís territory, in partnership with Forest Peoples Programme: The project aims not only to assist the Wampís indigenous community of Peru in securing the legal rights to their ancestral lands but also to gain legal recognition of their rights as a collective identity both in Peru and internationally. Through efficient and sustainable agricultural techniques and cacao production the indigenous community will benefit from an increase in income. The Wampís are an organised and proactive group who are already working tirelessly to conserve their forests, mitigating climate change and fighting illegal logging and mining activities. The project also provides training and funding to enable the Wampís to monitor land-use change and forest loss. which will assist the Wampís settlements across the 1.4m territory in their plight to secure the tenure to their ancestral lands.
 Protecting Conkouati-Douli National Park (CDNP), in partnership with WCS: CDNP is the most ecologically diverse park in the Republic of Congo, extending from the Atlantic coast to inland mountains and savannah. Habitats include beaches, mangroves, lagoons, and inland lakes surrounded by a mountain chain with dense tropical forest. 7,000 people live in or around the national park and rely on the forests for their livelihoods. This project works with the local community to ensure long-term protection of CDNP's biodiversity by developing sustainable resource management and community engagement. Offering alternative sources of revenue and protein improving attitudes toward the Park and dissuading the population from participating in illegal degrading activities.
 Kariba REDD+, in partnership with South Pole Group: This project is based in Lake Kariba, northern Zimbabwe. The project aims to set up a world-class wildlife management area within the proposed Green Zambezi Corridor (GZA) conserving the wildlife, land and self-empowering the local people with small-holder business opportunities. This programme provides a variety of workshops, enabling an empowered and self-reliant community who are able to protect their environment and livelihood. These include Moringa leaf production, conservation farming, community gardening, beekeeping and borehole resuscitation and maintenance. These activities will lead to an increase in food production and food security for the local community.

Funders (past and present) 
Organisations who fund the work of Size of Wales:
 The Waterloo Foundation
 Welsh Government
 Millennium Stadium Charitable Trust
 Fondation Prince Albert II de Monaco
 Hub Cymru Africa
 Ernest Kleinwort
 Ajahma Trust

Supporting Partners 
Organisations who support the work of Size of Wales:

Enterprise Holdings
Public Health Wales
Natural Resources Wales
McLays 
Lightology
Minuteman Press
Community Carbon Link
Eco-Schools Wales
Cardiff University
YnNi Teg
InterClimate Network
National Botanic Garden of Wales
Centre for Alternative Technology
WCIA
PONT
Freerotation Festival
Coed Cymru
Bangor University
Mbale Coed

Membership 
Size of Wales are proud members of:
 Tropical Forest Alliance 2020
 Cynnal Cymru
 WCVA

See also
 Queen's Commonwealth Canopy

References

External links 
 Official website
 Prince launching 'Size of Wales' project in Llanarthne, BBC, 7 September 2010
 Support for 'Size of Wales' rainforest campaign, BBC, 22 May 2011

Nature conservation organisations based in the United Kingdom